Odisha State Highway 6 is a state highway of Odisha. It connects Muniguda and Odisha State Highway 5 to the city of Bhawanipatna in the northwest.

References

6